Pygmalion is a monodrama in one act by composer Georg Benda with a German libretto by Friedrich Wilhelm Gotter. Pygmalion was the fourth of the five theatrical collaborations of Benda and Gotter. Gotter based his text on Jean-Jacques Rousseau's 1762 play Pygmalion. Benda's melodrama is unusual as it has no singing roles. Two of the three characters, Pygmalion and Galatea, are spoken roles; the other, Venus, is silently acted on stage.


Synopsis
Pygmalion, having renounced women, is in love with the statue he has made, his Galatea. Venus allows her to come to life, giving him final happiness.

Discography
Cast: Brigitte Quadlbauer (Ariadne) and Peter Uray (Pygmalion). Released in 1996 on the Naxos label.

References

External links

 Pygmalion at Naxos Records

Operas
Operas set in Cyprus
German-language operas
1779 operas
Operas by Georg Benda
Melodramas
Monodrama
Operas based on Metamorphoses
Works based on Pygmalion from Ovid's Metamorphoses